The FEU–Diliman Baby Tamaraws is the high school varsity team of Far Eastern University–Diliman in the University Athletic Association of the Philippines (UAAP), together with the Far Eastern University senior teams, the FEU Tamaraws and the FEU Lady Tamaraws.

Championship Tally 
The FEU-Diliman Baby Tamaraws participate in six out of eleven sports in the UAAP Junior's Division (as of UAAP Season 77). Below are the total number of championships won in the UAAP (combined boys and girls, where applicable).

The Tamaraw and Team colors 
 The Tamaraw is the mascot of all FEU varsity athletic teams. It is the pet name of every FEU student (Tams). Known scientifically as "Bubalus mindorensis", it is a rare animal found only in the island of Mindoro. The Tamaraw is one of the most intelligent, pugnacious, and aggressive of Philippine animal species. The university colors are green and gold. Gold represents the golden opportunity for the university to serve the youth and for her alumni to serve the country. Green is for hope, representing the founder's "fair hope of the fatherland."

Ranking 
The following UAAP events are participated in by FEU-Diliman. These events are the seasons wherein the UAAP had eight participating universities, which is based on latest event formats implemented on each particular event until the current season:

Basketball

Pre – UAAP Season 78 (A.Y. 2015–16) Team Rosters 

The Baby Tamaraws Basketball Team Roster

Coaching Staff 
 Head coach: Michael Oliver
 Assistant coaches:
 Ronald Magtulis
 Allan Albano
 Richard Delarosa
 Carlo Manso

Notable Baby Tamaraw Alumni

See also 
Far Eastern University – Nicanor Reyes Educational Foundation

References 

Baby
University Athletic Association of the Philippines teams